Kishwer Merchant Rai (born 3 February 1981) is an Indian television actress and model. Merchant is well known for acting in the shows Hip Hip Hurray, Ek Hasina Thi, Itna Karo Na Mujhe Pyaar, Har Mushkil Ka Hal Akbar Birbal, Pyaar Kii Ye Ek Kahaani and Kaisi Yeh Yaariyan. She was a contestant in the reality show Bigg Boss 9 in 2015.

Life and career

Early life and debut show (1997–2009)
Merchant was born into an Ismaili (Aga Khani Khoja) family in Mumbai to Siraj Merchant and Rizwana Merchant. She  started her career in 1997 with the TV show Shaktimaan, in which she played Julia, an assistant. She then played Nonie in the popular show Hip Hip Hurray from 1998 to 2000. Kishwar then appeared in many successful popular shows like Babul Ki Duwayen Leti Jaa, Des Mein Niklla Hoga Chand, Kutumb, Kasautii Zindagii Kay, Kayaamat, Hatim and Khichdi.

Kishwar appeared in many Balaji shows like Kkavyanjali and Kasamh Se. In 2007, she played the positive role of Tamanna in Sanaya Irani and Arjun Bijlani's popular youth show Miley Jab Hum Tum in 2008. She is very popular for playing Haseena in the popular Sukirti Kandpal and Vivian Dsena series Pyaar Kii Ye Ek Kahaani. She also played a role of Sonia in the second season of the hit show – Chhoti Bahu.

Breakthrough and success (2012–2015)
In 2012, Merchant was seen in two shows Amrit Manthan and Arjun. Then came  many shows like Hongey Judaa Na Hum and Parvarrish. She appeared in the popular shows Ek Hasina Thi as Raima, Madhubala – Ek Ishq Ek Junoon as Ananya, Kaisi Yeh Yaariyan as Nyonika and Itna Karo Na Mujhe Pyaar as Dimpy, sharing the screen with many popular actresses like Drashti Dhami and Sanjeeda Sheikh.

Bigg Boss and further success (2015–present)
Merchant was a participant in the reality TV show Bigg Boss 9 along with her boyfriend Suyyash Rai in 2015. She was paired with Aman Yatan Verma. Merchant, was forced to quit the Ticket to Finale task in its last leg and walked out of the house involuntarily with Rs 15 lakhs.

In 2016, Kishwar made her comeback with Balaji's popular show Brahmarakshas, playing the main antagonist- Aprajita.

In April 2017, Kishwar was seen in yet another Ekta Kapoor's show, Dhhai Kilo Prem, which airs on Star Plus. She played a cameo appearance as Shilpa. In May 2017, she was seen in Rashmi Sharma's Savitri Devi College & Hospital on Colors, but later she quit the show. Kishwar was also playing Asha in &TV's show Gangaa, which stars Aditi Sharma. The show went off air on 2 June 2017.

Personal life

In 2010, Kishwer Merchant started dating co-actor Suyyash Rai. They got married on 16 December 2016. On 2 March 2021 the couple announced that they were expecting their first child.

On 27 August 2021, the couple became parents to a boy and named him 'Nirvair'.

Television

Films

References

External links 

 

Kishwer Merchantt on YouTube

Living people
Actresses from Mumbai
1981 births
Indian Ismailis
Actresses in Hindi television
Indian television actresses
20th-century Indian actresses
21st-century Indian actresses
Actresses in Hindi cinema
Indian film actresses
Bigg Boss (Hindi TV series) contestants
Fear Factor: Khatron Ke Khiladi participants
Actors from Mumbai
Khoja Ismailism
Gujarati people